Gallager may refer to:

Gallager carbine, rifle used in the American Civil War

People with the surname
Robert G. Gallager, information theorist

See also
Gallagher (disambiguation)
Gallaher (disambiguation)
Gallacher